Yidam  is a type of deity associated with tantric or Vajrayana Buddhism said to be manifestations of Buddhahood or enlightened mind. During personal meditation (sādhana) practice, the yogi identifies their own form, attributes and mind with those of a yidam for the purpose of transformation. Yidam is sometimes translated by the terms "meditational deity" or "tutelary deity". Examples of yidams include the meditation deities Chakrasamvara, Kalachakra, Hevajra, Yamantaka, and Vajrayogini, all of whom have a distinctive iconography, mandala, mantra, rites of invocation and practice.

In Vajrayana, the yidam is one of the three roots of the inner refuge formula and is also the key element of deity yoga since the 'deity' in the yoga is the yidam.

Etymology
Yidam is said to be a contraction of Tib. yid-kyi-dam-tshig, meaning "samaya of mind" or in other words, the state of being indestructibly bonded with the inherently pure and liberated nature of mind. This is said to be the act that balances energies coursing within the pranic ida and pingala channels in the subtle bodies of both participants. The practitioner focuses on and identifies with the resultant Buddha-form or 'meditation deity', the yidam (Tibetan) associated with IDA channel.

The Sanskrit word  or  a compound of iṣṭa (desired, liked, reverenced) + devatā (a deity or divine being) is a term associated with yidam in many popular books on Buddhist Tantra but has not been attested in any Buddhist tantric text in Sanskrit.

Three Roots
The yidam appears as one of the Three Roots in the Tibetan Buddhist 'Inner' refuge formulation. The iconography of the yidam may be 'peaceful', 'wrathful' (Tibetan tro wa) or 'neither peaceful or wrathful' (Tibetan: shi ma tro), depending on the practitioner's own nature. The yidam represents awakening and so its appearance reflects whatever is required by the practitioner in order to awaken. The guru will guide the student as to which yidam is appropriate for them and then initiation into the mandala of the Ishta-deva is given by the guru, so that deity yoga practices can be undertaken. In essence, the mindstream of the guru and the yidam are indivisible. The yidam is considered to be the root of success in the practice.

In East Asian Buddhism
The Vajrayana traditions of China, Korea and Japan, while smaller and less prominent than Indo-Tibetan tantric Buddhism, are characterized in part by the utilization of yidams in meditation, though they use their own terms. One prominent ishta-devata in East Asian Vajrayana is Marici (Ch: Molichitian, Jp: Marishi-ten). In the Shingon tradition of Japan, prominent yidam include the "five mysteries of Vajrasattva," which are Vajrasattva (Jp. Kongosatta "金剛薩埵"), Surata / Ishta-vajrinī (Jp. Yoku-kongonyo "慾金剛女"), Kelikilā-vajrinī (Jp. Shoku-kongonyo "触金剛女"), Kāmā / Rāga-vajrinī (Jp. Ai-kongonyo "愛金剛女"), and Kāmesvarā / Mana-vajrinī (Jp. Man-kongonyo "慢金剛女").

In Nepalese Newar Buddhism
The principal yidam in the Newar Vajrayana tradition of Nepal are Chakrasamvara and Vajravarahi. In that tradition, three components are essential to a temple complex: a main shrine symbolizing Svayambhu Mahachaitya; an exoteric shrine featuring Buddha Shakyamuni and other buddhas and bodhisattvas; and an esoteric shrine dedicated to the yidam, to which only initiates may be admitted.

Working definition
According to The Tonglen and Mind Training Site which discusses Tonglen and Ngöndro, Yidam is:

Exegesis
During the (meditation) practice of the generation stage, a practitioner (sadhaka) establishes a strong familiarity with the Ishta-deva (an enlightened being) by means of visualization and a high level of concentration. During the practice of the completion stage, a practitioner focuses on methods to actualize the transformation of one's own mindstream and body into the meditation deity by meditation and yogic techniques of energy-control such as kundalini (tummo in Tibetan). Through these complementary disciplines of generation and completion one increasingly perceives the pervasive Buddha nature.

Judith Simmer-Brown summarises:

Berzin (1997: unpaginated) in discussing Buddhist refuge commitment and bodhisattva vows frames a caution to sadhana:

In the Vajrayana practices of Tibetan Buddhism, 'safe direction', or 'refuge' is undertaken through the Three Roots, the practitioner relying on an Ishta-deva in deity yoga as a means of becoming a Buddha.

Common yidams
Some common yidams include Hayagriva, Vajrakilaya (Dorje Phurba), Samputa, Guhyasamaja, Yamantaka, Hevajra, Kurukulla, Cakrasamvara, Vajrayogini, and Kalachakra. Also, other enlightened beings such as the regular forms of the Buddhas, Bodhisattvas, Padmasambhava, certain Dharmapalas, Dakinis, Wealth Deities, and yab-yum representations, among others, can also be practiced as a yidam. Avalokiteshvara, Tara, Manjusri, Hevajra and consort Nairatmya, Heruka-Chakrasamvara and consort Vajravarahi, etc. are frequently chosen as yidams, but any deity of the tantric pantheon may be adopted as such. The yidam is used as a means or a goal of transformation towards full enlightenment. According to certain traditions, the Ishtadevas are considered as the emanation of the adept's own mind.

See also
Five Dhyani Buddhas
Thoughtform
Wisdom Kings

Notes

External links

 Yidam Deities in Vajrayana 
 Dharma dictionary:Yidam 
 Yidams - the Source of Accomplishments
A View on Buddhism - Tantric practice

 
Vajrayana practices
Anthropology of religion
Tutelary deities